Mr A's Amazing Maze Plays is a play written by Alan Ayckbourn in 1988. It relies heavily on the audience for many scenes inside Mr Accousticus' house.

Plot 

Summary: The story begins with young Susie/Suzy being given a puppy (Neville) as a gift from her kind mother. Her father disappeared while taking part in the Great International Balloon Race and hasn't been seen since. Soon after, Mr Constantine Accousticus moves into the large mansion across the road. Strange events occur soon after, noticed by Suzy and loyal Neville (Like birds losing their song and their neighbor Mr. Passerby, the once great opera singer losing his voice) but which are oblivious to her mother, who is too charmed by Mr Accousticus to notice what's happening around her.

Early in the play we are informed that Suzy is a lonely child, because most children at her school are rather rich and their parents do not wish for them to play with children as poor as Suzy, and her mother spends all day working at a biscuit shop, so she has no time to spare with Suzy. Instead, she saves up money for a special present, and one day gives Suzy a puppy, which Suzy names Neville. Neville likes eating, and soon grows far too big to live in the small cottage with Suzy and her mother, so he is told to sleep on the porch. While here it is revealed that Suzy's mother has a problem with pronouncing words, despite being quite clever really (e.g. she says "Eiderdeiderdown" instead of Eiderdown). It is also revealed that Suzy last saw her father at the Great International Balloon Race, where he just went up, and up, and up, and never came down again, without Suzy ever getting the chance to tell him how much she loved him.

The next day Suzy and Neville meet with Mr. Passerby, who claims to have been a great opera singer, named the Great Passerbi. Neither Suzy nor Neville believe him, but he always has a fresh supply of chocolate cake, which Suzy and Neville always appreciate. He explains to them that he had to quit once someone had stolen his voice late at night and replaced it with the revolting one he now has. He  tells Suzy and Neville that he now sleeps with an orange beneath his chin to keep his mouth shut to prevent it happening again.

Later on, Suzy and Neville discover a large, new lock on abandoned old mansion across the road. The mansion is huge, with over 50 rooms and hallways, and Suzy tells her mother, after briefly forgetting after her mother tells Suzy she has received a promotion at the biscuit shop. Suzy states that Suzy may not play in the mansion's garden anymore, as the new owner will probably dislike them playing in their garden.

Later, while mother is telling Suzy and Neville a scary ghost story, their new neighbor introduces himself as Constantine Accousticus. Mother instantly falls for his charms, but Suzy and Neville are deeply afraid of him.

Soon after Suzy and Neville come across Mr. Passerby, who has lost his voice again. Suzy and Neville leave him to convalesce and get him cough sweets, when they hear his voice at Mr. Accousticus' house, singing. They rush home to inform their mother, and tell her that Mr. Accousticus stole Mr. Passerby's voice, which they back up with the fact that the birds in Mr Accousticus' garden have stopped singing, which they noticed earlier in the day. Earlier in the day Mr. Accousticus told Suzy and Neville how they must always be quiet, as he has very fine hearing (He can even hear hearts beating). Mother, however, refuses to believe any of it.

That night, Mr. Accousticus comes over to Suzy's little cottage, very late. Neville, already on the porch, starts barking to alert Suzy and her mother. Mr. Accousticus then steals Neville's bark. After this, Suzy and Neville devise a plan to sneak into the mansion and find out where Mr. Accousticus puts away all of his stolen voices.

Once they are in the house the audience then decides which rooms the two enter, eventually leading to the heart of the house: Mr. Accousticus' study. There they find a cupboard full of the many sounds Mr. Accousticus has stolen. Here they are discovered by Mr. Accousticus who threatens to steal both their voices again, after they have just recovered Neville's bark. To escape, the open every drawer in the cupboard, releasing all the stolen sounds and causing a racket intolerably loud for Mr. Accousticus.

They run back to find the mother has had her voice stolen by Mr. Accousticus, who then catches up with them and begins to steal Suzy's voice, but then, out of the blue, Father comes down in his balloon. He hits Mr. Accousticus with it, accidentally, who runs away, never to be seen again. Father explains that he has been surviving off the large supply of corned beef in his balloon and rainwater. No matter how they try, Suzy, Neville and mother are never able to convince father of what has happened, and they all live as a family again, happily ever after.

Characters

Suzy/Susie

Suzy is the young heroine of the play. She is a lonely child, due to the arrogance of her classmates and the working hours of her mother. She doesn't think of herself as either brave or special, but she  most certainly is both. She is very kind and polite, and very protective of Neville.

Neville

Neville is Suzy's loyal canine companion. He begins as a very small puppy, but due to his fondness of eating he grows into a very big dog. He also enjoys sleeping, and has a magnificent bark. He barks at everything, under the belief that he is protecting the sleeping Suzy and her mother (Although due to the constant barking, not very much sleeping takes place). He barks at moths, bats, owls, cats, and especially people coming home late from the pub.

Mother

Mother is very kind. She works all day at a biscuit shop to earn money for her family, and at night tells Suzy and Neville stories which she makes up herself. Despite loving her long lost husband very much, she falls for the charms of Mr. Accousticus very hard and fast. She is an excellent cook and is promoted right after Suzy and Neville discover the new lock on the mansion's door, meaning much more money for the family.

Mr. Accousticus

Mr. Accousticus is the charming yet very scary new neighbor to Suzy and her family. He has exquisite hearing, which is the reason he has chosen such a large house to live in (For the peace and quiet). He steals the sounds of almost everything that annoys him, including both of Mr. Passerby's voices, the bird's song and Neville's bark, which he locks away in a cupboard in his study.

Mr. Passerby

Mr. Passerby is Suzy's neighbor. He was once a great opera singer, named the Great Passerbi, who tends to embellish his stories. Despite once being famous and very loved, his voice was stolen by Mr. Accousticus late at night, and was replaced by a haggard one which he couldn't possibly sing opera with. He then drinks much more than is good for him and paints white lines down the center of roads. He also sleeps with an orange under his chin, before his voice is stolen again by Mr. Accousticus.

Narrators 1 and 2

The two narrators are present throughout the story, telling the story as it goes, and explaining many points.

1988 plays
English plays